Jaroslav Svoboda (born 21 May 1944) is a Czech former skier. He competed in the Nordic combined event at the 1972 Winter Olympics where he placed 28th.

References

External links
 

1944 births
Living people
People from Železný Brod
Czech male Nordic combined skiers
Olympic Nordic combined skiers of Czechoslovakia
Nordic combined skiers at the 1972 Winter Olympics
Sportspeople from the Liberec Region